Uzama Douglas Esewi (7 December 1998 – 29 December 2016) was a Nigerian football player in the position of defender for the Nigerian U-17 and U-20 teams. He was signed on loan from Karamone by the Nigeria National League team Gombe United F.C. in the second division league and assisted the team to be promoted into the Nigeria Premier League in 2016.

Career
Uzama Douglas was discovered by Karamone and made his professional debut with Gombe United F.C. in 2014 then was promoted into the Nigeria Premier League in 2016 season. He received interest from top Nigeria Premier League and top European teams since he had been in the Nigeria U-17 in 2015 and presently in the Nigeria U-20.

He was shot and killed on 29 December 2016 in Benin City.

References

External links
•	 UZAMA DOUGLAS PROFILE  – CAF U17 NATIONS CUP PLAYERS PROFILE
•

1998 births
2016 deaths
Nigerian footballers
Nigeria Professional Football League players
Nigeria National League
Nigeria international footballers
Association football defenders
Nigerian expatriate footballers
Expatriate footballers in Nigeria
Gombe United F.C. players
Karamone F.C. players
Igbo sportspeople
Sportspeople from Benin City
Nigeria youth international footballers
Nigeria under-20 international footballers
Deaths by firearm in Nigeria